Peet Johanson (1881–1939) was an Estonian farmer and politician.

Johanson was born on 21 February 1881 in Sürgavere Parish (now Põhja-Sakala Parish) in Kreis Fellin and worked as a farmer. He was elected to the Estonian Provincial Assembly, which governed the Autonomous Governorate of Estonia between 1917 and 1919; he was then elected to the newly formed Republic of Estonia's Asutav Kogu (Constituent Assembly), serving for the whole term (1919–20) as a member of the Estonian Labour Party. He also served as Minister of Food between 26 October 1920 and 25 January 1921. Johanson died in 1939 in Germany.

References 

1881 births
1939 deaths
People from Põhja-Sakala Parish
People from Kreis Fellin
Estonian Labour Party politicians
Government ministers of Estonia
Members of the Estonian Provincial Assembly
Members of the Estonian Constituent Assembly
Estonian farmers